Andrews Bald is a mountain in the Great Smoky Mountains, located in the Southeastern United States. The mountain is one of two grassy balds maintained in the range by the park service. The other is Gregory Bald, in the western Smokies.

Andrews Bald is a double peak situated along Forney Ridge, just south of Clingmans Dome.  The mountain appears in the Clingmans Dome quad on USGS topographical maps.  Andrews Bald is the 62nd-highest mountain in North Carolina, and is located entirely within Swain County.

Unlike Gregory Bald, the bald area of Andrews doesn't cover the summit, but spreads out around the south slope.  How and why grassy balds form is a mystery.  While cattle grazing maintained the balds throughout the 19th-century, the forest slowly started reclaiming them after the formation of the national park in the 1930s. In the early 1980s, the park service polled park visitors regarding the state of the grassy balds, and the response was overwhelmingly in favor of maintaining the balds atop Gregory and Andrews.

Andrews Bald is probably named after Andres Thompson, an early settler who used the mountain for hunting. A cabin once stood on the southwest slope, near the tip of the present bald area. Herders' shacks were not uncommon in the high-elevation grazing areas of southern Appalachia during the late 19th and early 20th centuries, so the cabin may have been a seasonal residence.

The Forney Ridge Trail crosses Andrews Bald, passing to within a few feet of the summit, and traverses the entire bald area en route to Springhouse Branch.  The trail intersects the Appalachian Trail on the slopes of Clingmans Dome, and can be accessed from the Forney Ridge parking lot.  The bald area is just under two miles (3 km) from the parking lot.

References

External links 
 Great Smoky Mountains National Park Trail Map - Large file in .pdf format.
 Grassy balds in (and near) Tennessee - Tennessee Landforms
 
 
 NPS History of Grassy Balds in Smokies
 Andrews Bald hiking information

Mountains of Great Smoky Mountains National Park
Mountains of North Carolina
Protected areas of Swain County, North Carolina
Appalachian balds
Mountains of Swain County, North Carolina